Robert Rattray  Mangin (1 October 1863 – 27 June 1944) was Archdeacon of Lindisfarne  from 1924 until his death.

Mangin was educated at Marlborough College  and New College, Oxford. After a curacy at Newburn he held incumbencies in  Alnwick, Ashington, Benwell.

His son Sir Thorleif Rattray Orde Mangin was a colonial administrator.

References

1863 births
People educated at Marlborough College
Alumni of New College, Oxford
Archdeacons of Lindisfarne
1944 deaths